Requiem & Gallipoli is the seventh album by Astrid Williamson and contains her first full classic composition.

Williamson first performed Requiem & Gallipoli at Requiem for the Fallen, a D-Day Remembrance event at All Saints' Church, Hessle, Yorkshire on 6 June 2015. The event raised funds for a local Hull veterans' charity and Operation Warrior Wellness, a process to address post-traumatic stress disorder in veterans using transcendental mediation in collaboration with the David Lynch Foundation.

Williamson explained the writing process: "I would translate each movement from Latin, then start writing the music at the piano, later orchestrating and singing each individual voice; as I began to transcribe the piano arrangement for the orchestra I found myself thinking, 'this section must to be on flute, not oboe, not bassoon', it was incredibly intuitive work – the music seemed to unfurl before me. I actually dreamt the 'In Paradisum' and had to get up and write it down immediately. I also found it liberating that in essence the piece was not personal to events in my life. It was refreshing to not be pouring out my experiences, rather I felt I was drawing upon a more collective understanding of loss and release."

Track listing 
 Requiem
 Kyrie
 Domine Jesu
 Hostias
 Sanctus
 Agnus Dei
 Libera Me
 In Paradisium 
 Gallipoli (solo piano version)
 Gallipoli (orchestral version)

References 

2015 albums
Astrid Williamson albums